The 1957–58 Irish Cup was the 78th edition of the premier knock-out cup competition in Northern Irish football. 

Ballymena United won the cup for the 2nd time, defeating Linfield 2–0 in the final at The Oval. 

Glenavon were the holders but they were defeated 4-2 by Linfield in the semi-finals.

Results

First round

|}

Replay

|}

Quarter-finals

|}

Replay

|}

Semi-finals

|}

Final

References

External links
The Rec.Sport.Soccer Statistics Foundation - Northern Ireland - Cup Finals

Irish Cup seasons
1957–58 in Northern Ireland association football
1957–58 domestic association football cups